Cavendish College may refer to:

in England
Cavendish College London, closed in 2011
Cavendish College, Cambridge, a historic University of Cambridge college founded by Joseph Lloyd Brereton, which operated during approximately 1873 to 1892
Lucy Cavendish College, Cambridge, founded in 1865

See also
Cavendish University (disambiguation), including three universities in Africa associated with the former Cavendish College London